In order to support the sector and increase availability of loans, the Central Bank of Armenia (CBA) started the process of monetary policy easing by systematically lowering the refinancing rate, which decreased by 4.5p.p. down to 6% between 2015-2017. This has pushed banks to revise rates on loans and deposits downwards, evidenced by dropping credit and deposit rates from 14,7% to 10,7% and from 9,7% to 5,3% in 2016-2017 respectively.

See also
 List of banks in Armenia
 Economy of Armenia
 Central Bank of Armenia

References

External links 
Armenia Banking Information
HSBC Bank Armenia website